Carmentina taiwanensis is a species of sedge moths in the genus Carmentina. It was described by Yutaka Arita and John B. Heppner in 1992. It is found in Taiwan.

References

External links
 Carmentina taiwanensis at Zipcodezoo.com

Moths described in 1992
Glyphipterigidae